La Cama ( The Bed) is a 1968 Argentine comedy film directed by Emilio Gómez Muriel.

Cast
 Mauricio Garcés as Charlie
 Isela Vega 
 Lupita Ferrer
 Zulma Faiad as Lucy Montes
 Rosángela Balbó as Murcama
 Enrique Rocha
 Marcela López Rey as Ana
 Elvia Andreoli (credited as Elvia Evans)
 Jorge Barreiro as Ramiro Ramos
 Jorge Brisco
 Amparito Castro
 Rafael Chumbito
 Rodolfo Crespi
 María Dolores Pardo
 Mauricio Ferrer
 Susana Ferrer
 Pochi Grey
 Sonia Grey
 Guendolina
 Nancy Lopresti
 Lalo Malcolm
 Miguel A. Olmos
 Vicente Rubino as Hector
 Víctor Tasca

External links
 

1968 films
Argentine comedy films
1960s Spanish-language films
1960s Argentine films